Gianmarco Ercoli (born 5 May 1995 in Rome) is an Italian professional racing driver that currently competes in the NASCAR Whelen Euro Series, driving the No. 54 Chevrolet Camaro for CAAL Racing in the EuroNASCAR PRO class. He is a former one-time champion in the Euro Series, having won the Elite 2 championship title in 2015.

Racing career
Ercoli started his racing career in 2003 on karting. During his karting career, he won the 2009 Italian Open Masters in the KF3 class. He made his racing debut in 2014 when CAAL Racing entered him in the second round of the 2014 NASCAR Whelen Euro Series season at Brands Hatch. He scored his career podium finish in his home race at Magione. Ercoli would finish his debut season in 11th place with 2 podium finishes and 5 Top-10 finishes.

Driving for Double T by MRT Nocentini in the No. 9 team in 2015, he beat Stienes Longin by 0.3 seconds to score a victory in the first Elite 2 race of the season at Valencia, his first career win in the Euro Series. At Tours, he scored his first win on an oval when he beat Ulysse Delsaux in a green-white-checkered finish on the Sunday race. Ercoli would sweep the season finale round at Zolder to claim the Elite 2 title despite he entered the race in fourth place in the championship. Ercoli would finish his season with four wins, ten Top-5s, and eleven Top-10 finishes.

As a reward for winning the Elite 2 title, Ercoli made his racing debut in the United States in 2016 when he took part in a NASCAR Whelen All-American Series late model race at New Smyrna. He moved up to the Elite 1 class for the 2016 season, staying with the No. 9 Double T team. Ercoli finished his debut season in Elite 1 in 8th place with 4 Top-5s and 6 Top-10 finishes, achieving a best finishing result of fourth in the second race at Venray and the first race at Zolder.

In 2017, he stayed in the No. 9 team as Double T and Vict Motorsport merged to form Racers Motorsport. Ercoli would improve his position in the Elite 1 championship as he finished the 2017 season in 7th place with 8 Top-10 finishes with a best finish of 5th at Brands Hatch.

In 2018, Ercoli scored his first Elite 1 podium finish in his home race at Franciacorta before he became the first Elite 2 alumnus to win a race in the Elite 1 class after he scored a victory from pole position in the Sunday race at Brands Hatch. Ercoli would finish the season in 8th place once again, having scored 1 victory, 3 Top-5s, and 8 Top-10 finishes.

Ercoli began the 2019 NASCAR Whelen Euro Series season with two finishes outside of the Top-20 in the season opening round at Valencia. His first Top-10 finish of the season came at his home race at Franciacorta, where he finished in 7th place on the Saturday race. His first Top 5 finish came during the Playoff races at Hockenheim, where he finished 4th in the Saturday race before he scored his only podium finish of the season with a third-place finish in the Sunday race. He closed his season with a double Top 5 finish at Zolder to secure 6th place in the championship, his best championship finish in Elite 1 so far. He finished the 2019 season with 1 podium, 4 Top-5s, and 8 Top-10 finishes.

Ercoli rejoined CAAL Racing on 2020 as the replacement driver for Alon Day, who left the team to join PK Carsport. He won on just his second race with CAAL at Vallelunga, but he later received a 10-point penalty for jumping the start. For the third round at Rijeka, Ercoli temporarily raced Mishumotors' No. 70 car after teammate Arianna Casoli suffered a heavy crash in EuroNASCAR 2 Qualifying that wrote off the No. 54 car's chassis. He would eventually finish the year in sixth with one win, 3 podiums, and 8 Top-5 finishes.

Complete motorsports results

NASCAR

Whelen Euro Series - EuroNASCAR PRO
(key) Bold - Pole position awarded by fastest qualifying time (in Race 1) or by previous race's fastest lap (in Race 2). Italics - Fastest lap. * – Most laps led.  ^ – Most positions gained.)

Whelen Euro Series - Elite 2
(key) Bold - Pole position awarded by fastest qualifying time (in Race 1) or by previous race's fastest lap (in Race 2). Italics - Fastest lap. * – Most laps led.  ^ – Most positions gained.)

 Season still in progress

References

External links

1995 births
Living people
Racing drivers from Rome
NASCAR drivers